Banghart is a surname. Notable people with the surname include:

Basil Banghart (1901–1982), American criminal, burglar, and prison escape artist
Courtney Banghart (born 1978), American basketball player and coach